The Peace of Riga, also known as the Treaty of Riga, was signed in Riga on , by Poland, Soviet Russia (acting also on behalf of Soviet Belarus) and Soviet Ukraine. The treaty ended the Polish–Soviet War.

The Soviet-Polish borders established by the treaty remained in force until World War II. They were later redrawn during the Tehran Conference, Yalta Conference and Potsdam Conference.

Background 

World War I removed former state borders across Europe. Following the Russian Revolution which had renounced Tsarist claims to Poland, as well as the Central Powers provisions for Congress Poland in the March 1918 Treaty of Brest-Litovsk, The Great War had ended with the collapse of the Central Powers. The Treaty of Versailles had re-established Poland's independence after a century and a half of being divided by three empires.

The Russian Civil War presented an opportunity for Poland, under the leadership of Józef Piłsudski, to regain parts of the territories of the former Polish–Lithuanian Commonwealth that had been incorporated into the Russian Empire during the Partitions of Poland–Lithuania. In 1920, Piłsudski's initially successful military offensive into Ukraine, whose aim was to establish an independent Ukraine in alliance with Poland, was met with a Soviet counter-offensive into central Poland. Poland was seen by the Soviets, who intended to extend the revolution westwards, as a land bridge to Western Europe. The Polish–Soviet War culminated in the Battle of Warsaw, won by the Poles. Further military setbacks persuaded Soviet Russia to enter into peace treaty negotiations. This was a relief for the government of Poland, a country heavily damaged and exhausted by the war, who also wanted to conclude peace talks. Piłsudski and his supporters, however, having failed in their quest, opposed the peace process.

Negotiations 

The Polish delegation made a counter-offer on 2 October. Three days later the Soviets offered amendments to the Polish offer, which Poland accepted. An armistice was signed on 12 October and went into effect on 18 October 1920. The chief negotiators were Jan Dąbski for Poland and Adolph Joffe for the Russian Soviet Federative Socialist Republic. The Soviet side insisted, successfully, on excluding non-communist Ukrainian representatives from the negotiations.

The Soviets' military setbacks made their delegation offer Poland substantial territorial concessions in the contested border areas. However, to many observers, it looked as though the Polish side conducted the Riga talks as if  Poland had lost the war. The Polish delegation was dominated by members of the National Democrats, who were Piłsudski's political opponents. The National Democrats did not want non-Polish minorities in the reborn Polish state to constitute more than one-third of the overall population, therefore, prepared to accept a Polish-Soviet border substantially to the west of what was being offered by the Soviets even though it would leave hundreds of thousands of ethnic Poles on the Soviet side of the border.

That decision was also motivated by political objectives. The National Democrats' base of public support was among Poles in central and western Poland. In the east of the country and in the disputed borderlands, support for the National Democrats was greatly outweighed by support for Piłsudski, and in the countryside, outside the cities, Poles were outnumbered by Ukrainians or Belarusians in those areas. A border too far to the east would thus be against not only the National Democrats' ideological objective of minimising the minority population of Poland but also their electoral prospects. Warweary public opinion in Poland also favoured an end to the negotiations, and both sides remained under pressure from the League of Nations to reach a deal.

A special parliamentary delegation, consisting of six members of the Polish Sejm, held a vote on whether to accept the Soviets' far-reaching concessions, which would have left Minsk on the Polish side of the border. Pressured by the National Democrat ideologue, Stanisław Grabski, the 100 km of extra territory was rejected, a victory for the nationalist doctrine and a stark defeat for Piłsudski's federalism.

Regardless, the peace negotiations dragged on for months because of Soviet reluctance to sign. However, the matter became more urgent for the Soviet leadership, which had to deal with increased internal unrest towards the end of 1920, such as the Tambov Rebellion and later the Kronstadt rebellion against the Soviet authorities. As a result, Vladimir Lenin ordered the Soviet plenipotentiaries to finalise the peace treaty with Poland.

The Peace of Riga, signed on 18 March 1921, partitioned the disputed territories in Belarus and Ukraine between Poland and Russia and ended the conflict.

Terms
The Treaty consisted of 26 articles. Poland was to receive monetary compensation (30 million rubles in gold) for its economic input into the Russian Empire during the Partitions of Poland. Under Article 14 Poland was also to receive railway materials (locomotives, rolling stock, etc.) with a value of 29 million gold roubles. Russia was to surrender works of art and other Polish national treasures acquired from Polish territories after 1772 (such as the Jagiellonian tapestries and the Załuski Library). Both sides renounced claims to war compensation. Article 3 stipulated that border issues between Poland and Lithuania would be settled by those states.

Article 6 created citizenship options for persons on either side of the new border. Article 7 consisted of a mutual guarantee that all nationalities would be permitted "free intellectual development, the use of their national language, and the exercise of their religion." In the treaty, it was agreed that Poland would refuse to form federations with Lithuania, Belarus and Ukraine.

Aftermath
The Allied Powers were initially reluctant to recognise the treaty, which had been concluded without their participation. Their postwar conferences had supported the Curzon Line as the Polish-Russian border, and Poland's territorial gains in the treaty lay about 250 km east of that line. French support led to its recognition in March 1923 by France, the United Kingdom, Italy and Japan, followed by the United States in April.

In Poland, the Peace of Riga was met with criticism from the very beginning. Some characterised the treaty as short-sighted and argued that much of what Poland had gained during the Polish-Soviet war was lost during the peace negotiations. Józef Piłsudski had participated in the Riga negotiations only as an observer and called the resulting treaty "an act of cowardice". Piłsudski felt the agreement was a shameless and short-sighted political calculation, with Poland abandoning its Ukrainian allies. On 15 May 1921, he apologised to Ukrainian soldiers during his visit to the internment camp at Kalisz. The treaty substantially contributed to the failure of his plan to create a Polish-led Intermarium federation of Eastern Europe, as portions of the territory that had been proposed for the federation were ceded to the Soviets.

Lenin also considered the treaty unsatisfactory, as it forced him to put aside his plans for exporting the Soviet revolution to the West.

The Belarusian and Ukrainian independence movements saw the treaty as a setback. Four million Ukrainians and over a million Belarusians lived within areas ceded to Poland. In one estimate, only 15% of the population was ethnically Polish. The Ukrainian People's Republic, led by Symon Petliura, had been allied with Poland under the Treaty of Warsaw, which was abrogated by the Peace of Riga. The new treaty violated Poland's military alliance with the UPR, which had explicitly prohibited a separate peace. Doing so worsened relations between Poland and the Ukrainians who had supported Petliura. The supporters felt that Ukraine had been betrayed by its Polish ally, which would be exploited by the Organization of Ukrainian Nationalists and contribute to the growing tensions and eventual anti-Polish massacres in the 1930s and the 1940s. By the end of 1921, most Poland-allied Ukrainian, Belarusian and White Russian forces had been annihilated by Soviet forces or had crossed the border into Poland and laid down their arms.

According to the Belarusian historian Andrew Savchenko, Poland's new eastern border was "military indefensible and economically unviable" and a source of growing ethnic tensions, as the resulting minorities in Poland were too large to be ignored or assimilated and too small to win their desired autonomy.

Further consequences

While the Peace of Riga led to a two-decade stabilisation of Soviet-Polish relations, conflict was renewed with the Soviet invasion of Poland during World War II. The treaty was subsequently overridden after a decision by war's Allied powers to change Poland's borders once again and transfer the populations.

In the view of some foreign observers, the treaty's incorporation of significant minority populations into Poland led to seemingly insurmountable challenges, because the newly formed organizations such as OUN engaged in terror and sabotage actions across ethnically mixed areas to inflame conflict in the region. Nevertheless, many groups representing national minorities welcomed Piłsudski's return to power in 1926 providing opportunities to play a role in the Polish government.

The populations separated from Poland by the new Polish-Soviet border experienced a different fate from their fellow citizens. Ethnic Poles left within Soviet borders were subjected to discrimination and property confiscation. At least 111,000 were summarily executed in the NKVD operation in 1937/38, preceding other ethnic repression campaigns perpetrated during World War II, while others were exiled to different regions of the Soviet Union.

Belarusians and Ukrainians, having failed to create their own states, were subjects of repression in the Soviet Union, and even extermination e.g. during the Holodomor. Belarusians and Ukrainians living on the Polish side of the border were subjected to Polonization; which contributed to the rise of Ukrainian nationalist organisations and the adoption of terrorist tactics by Ukrainian extremists.

The Soviet Union, although thwarted in 1921, would see its sphere of influence expand as a result of World War II. After the Soviet Union established its control over the People's Republic of Poland, the Polish-Soviet border was moved westwards in 1945 to roughly coincide with the Curzon Line. This shift was accompanied by large population transfers which led to the expulsion of the Poles living east of the new border, and also moved most of the Ukrainian minority remaining in Poland to the former German territories that were ceded to Poland in compensation. The unified Belarusian and Ukrainian territories were fully incorporated into the USSR.

However, in 1989, Poland would regain its full sovereignty, and soon afterwards, with the fall of the Soviet Union, Belarus and Ukraine would go on to become independent nations.

See also 
 Polish minority in the Soviet Union
 Belarusian minority in Poland
 Ukrainian minority in Poland
 Byelorussian Soviet Socialist Republic
 Ukrainian Soviet Socialist Republic
 Aftermath of the Polish-Soviet War
 Polish Operation of the NKVD (1937–38)
 Latvian–Soviet Peace Treaty
 Soviet–Lithuanian Peace Treaty
 Treaty of Tartu (Estonia–Russia)
 Treaty of Tartu (Finland–Russia)

Notes

Further reading

 Dąbrowski, Stanisław. "The Peace Treaty of Riga." The Polish Review (1960) 5#1: 3–34. Online
 Davies, Norman, White Eagle, Red Star: the Polish-Soviet War, 1919–20, Pimlico, 2003, . (First edition: New York, St. Martin's Press, inc., 1972.)
 Materski, Wojciech. "The Second Polish Republic in Soviet Foreign Policy (1918–1939)." Polish Review 45.3 (2000): 331–345. online
 Traktat ryski 1921 roku po 75 latach, Wydawnictwo Uniwersytetu Mikołaja Kopernika, Toruń 1998,  (Chapter summaries in English)
 Photocopies of the Polish version of the Treaty. Dziedzictwo.polska.pl

Riga, Peace of
Polish–Soviet War
1921 in Ukraine
1921 in Belarus
1921 in Latvia
Treaties concluded in 1921
Treaties entered into force in 1921
Treaties of the Second Polish Republic
Treaties of the Russian Soviet Federative Socialist Republic
Treaties of the Ukrainian Soviet Socialist Republic
Poland–Russia relations
Poland–Ukraine military relations
20th century in Riga
Peace treaties of the Soviet Union
March 1921 events